Kulm law, Culm law  or Chełmno Law was a legal constitution for a municipal form of government used in several Central European cities during the Middle Ages.

It was initiated on 28 December 1233 in the Monastic State of the Teutonic Knights by Hochmeister Hermann von Salza and Hermann Balk when the towns of Thorn (Toruń) and Chełmno (Kulm) received German town law, in particular as a modification of Magdeburg rights. Named after the town it was signed in, the original  document (Kulmer Handfeste) was lost in 1244 when the town hall burned due to an attack by Swantopolk II, Duke of Pomerania. The renewed charter of 1 October 1251 was based on a copy in Thorn, but the rights were reduced.

This type of law was mostly granted by the Teutonic Order to cities within their monastic state, but also adopted by cities elsewhere, mainly in the neighboring independent Duchy of Masovia. In addition, the Kulm law was expanded, independently from the Knights, to a larger set of laws called Alter Kulm.

Cities located under Kulm law include:

See also 
German town law
Lübeck law
Magdeburg rights
History of Prussia
Håndfæstning, Handfeste

Literature 
 Jus Culmense ex ultima revisione, oder das vollständige culmische Recht, mit Anmerkungen. Danzig: Johann Friedrich Battels, 1767. 
 Janicka, Danuta. Prawo karne w trzech rewizjach prawa chełmińskiego z XVI wieku. Toruń: TNT, 1992. 
 Janicka, Danuta. Nauka o winie i karze w dziejach klasycznej szkoły prawa karnego w Niemczech w 1 połowie XIX wieku. Toruń: Wydaw. Uniwersytetu Mikołaja Kopernika, 1998. 
 Johanek, Peter. "Alter Kulm." In Die deutsche Literatur des Mittelalters. Verfasserlexikon, vol. 1, edited by Kurt Ruh, 267–269. Berlin: Auflage, 1978. 
 Rogatschewski, Alexander. "Zur Geschichte des 'Alten Kulms' und anderer preußischer Rechtsbücher nach St. Petersburger Quellen." In Deutschsprachige Literatur des Mittelalters im Östlichen Europa: Forschungsstand und Forschungsperspektiven, edited by R. G. Päsler and D. Schmidtke, 199–244. Heildelberg: Universitätsverlag Winter, 2006. 
 Päsler, Ralf G. Deutschsprachige Sachliteratur im Preußenland bis 1500: Untersuchungen zu ihrer Überlieferung, 197, 222–224, 243–252. Köln:  Bohlau, 2003. 
 Urban, William. The Prussian Crusade, 123–128. Lanham, MD: University Press of America, 1980. 

 
Legal history of the Holy Roman Empire
Urban planning in Germany